Pointe-aux-Anglais is a community in the city of Port-Cartier, Quebec, Canada, located halfway between Sept-Îles and Baie-Comeau (232 km), and some  from the town centre of Port-Cartier itself.

The "Stations of the cross" in the village church were sculpted by Médard Bourgault, an artist from Saint-Jean-Port-Joli.

History

In 1711, a large fleet commanded by Admiral Walker was sent from England to take Quebec. Due to fog on the St. Lawrence, eight ships grounded on the lle-aux-Oeuf reefs and went down with more than 900 men in one of the worst naval disasters in British history. The point of land just across from the reefs was named Pointe-aux-Anglais to commemorate the ill-fated expedition. It comprises the sectors of Pointe-aux-Anglais and Rivière-Pentecôte. An ecomuseum in Pointe-aux-Anglais explains how the English failed in their attempt to attack Quebec.

References

Communities in Côte-Nord